Agricultural Development Fund of Saudi Arabia (ADF) was founded pursuant to a royal decree in 1962. The main purpose of its establishment is to finance the agricultural activities in Saudi Arabia by providing loans to farmers. The Director General of the ADF is Munir bin Fahd Al Sahli. Since its establishment 54 years ago, IDF had paid an amount of  $8.8bn to support emerging and small farmers. 2018, ADF allocated an amount of $800m to promote the sustainable rural development program of Saudi Arabia.

References 

Agriculture in Saudi Arabia
Finance in Saudi Arabia
Financial services in Saudi Arabia